Quarry Bay School is the oldest English Schools Foundation primary school in Hong Kong. There are around 720 students. The principal is currently Sue Yee who started her role in August 2021.  Mina Dunstan was principal from 2012 until June 2021. The previous principal was Debra Gardiner who, before he retired, had been at Quarry Bay School for 4 years.

History
The juvenile hall was opened in 1926 to educate the children of expatriate dockyard workers. It remained in Quarry Bay until the 1970s, briefly interrupted by World War II when it was forced to operate in the Stanley Internment Camp. In 1980 it relocated to temporary premises in Victoria Barracks, and then in 1984 to its current location on Braemar Hill. 

A time capsule filled with children's work, messages and other items was buried in its gardens during the academic year of 1996-97 and still remains under the ground near the terrapin pond to be exhumed in 2027 to commemorate the 30th Anniversary of the Handover of Hong Kong.

References

External links 

 Official site

Defunct schools in Hong Kong
Primary schools in Hong Kong
English Schools Foundation schools
Braemar Hill
Educational institutions established in 1924
Grade III historic buildings in Hong Kong
1924 establishments in Hong Kong